Pagadian, officially the City of Pagadian (Subanen: Gembagel G'benwa Pagadian/Bagbenwa Pagadian), is a 2nd class component city and the capital of the province of Zamboanga del Sur, Philippines. It is the regional center of Zamboanga Peninsula and the second-largest city in the region and in the province, after the independent city of Zamboanga. According to the 2020 census, it has a population of 210,452 people. The city will be converted to a highly urbanized city by the virtue of Proclamation No. 1247, signed by President Rodrigo Duterte dated November 8, 2021, but shall take effect after the ratification in a plebiscite.

Pagadian began as stop-over for traders who plied the road between the old Spanish fort-town of Zamboanga on the southwestern tip of the Zamboanga Peninsula and other bigger towns to the north of the old Zamboanga Province. Except for its sheltered bay and good fishing grounds, it was not a promising site because it is situated on steeply rolling terrain. In the course of its local history, waves of different kinds of people came to stay, and eventually called among themselves "Pagadianons".

The iconic symbol of Pagadian is its uniquely designed tricycle built to adopt to the city's hilly terrain. It is the only place in the Philippines with a public transport inclined at about 25-40° angle.

Etymology
The city proper and surrounding areas of today's barangays of Muricay, Tawagan Sur and White Beach was originally named Talapukan, an indigenous word that means "a place of numerous springs." The officially accepted origin of its name are words taken from Iranun, pagad ("to wait") and padian ("market") which shows that Pagadian had been a trading area in the past. Other theories suggest that it was named after a bird that the native inhabitants call gagadian or that the city's name came from the word pangadyi ("prayer"), later to be known as pangadyian ("a place to pray" or "land of prayers"). The name Pagadian is also speculated to be derived from the Subanen word pengadian which means "school".

History

Early settlers
The native inhabitants in the area were the Lumads, specifically Subanens. Then came Iranun and Maguindanaon settlers who converted the people to Islam. A sizeable number of lumads who refused to be converted eventually settled in the highlands.

Spread of Islam
Pagadian was under the leadership of Datu Akob, an Iranun datu whose daughter caught the fancy of Datu Macaumbang (Sultan of Taga Nonok), also an Iranun from Malabang, Tukuran, also part of modern Pagadian. He was the son of Shariff Apo Tubo who descended from the bloodline of Shariff Kabungsuan, the first Sultan of the Maguindanao Sultanate. With the approval of Sultan Datu Akob, Datu Macaumbang married Bai Putri Panyawan Akob, the beautiful daughter of the royal datu of Pagadian City and royal bai putri of Raya.

Upon the death of Datu Akob also known as Datu Mimbalawag, his son-in-law, Datu Macaumbang (Sultan of taga Nonok) assumed leadership; he established the territorial boundaries of the present city proper, from Balangasan River in the west of Tawagan Sur River in the east. Beyond the river of Tawagan Sur was the territory of Datu Balimbingan. At one time, Datu Macaumbang requested the assistance of the Philippine constabulary due to the rampant banditry and piracy in the area. A detachment led by Col. Tiburcio Ballesteros stationed at Malangas landed at the place and stationed themselves at Dumagoc Island. The arrival of the soldiers restored peace and order, thereby attracting the influx of settlers from other places.

Spread of Christianity

Christian settlers started arriving in the early part of the 20th century, most of which came from Cebu as evident on the veneration of the Santo Niño de Cebú. The increasing Christian population prompted the creation of the Parish of Pagadian in 1938 and was administered by the Jesuits, Columban and Filipino priests. The original Santo Niño Church of Pagadian was right across the city plaza, on the site of the current San Jose Parish church. The present Santo Niño Cathedral is now located in San Francisco District and was built in 1968.

Pagadian Parish became a diocese on November 2, 1971, and is a suffragan of the Archdiocese of Ozamiz. Msgr. Jesus B. Tuquib served as the first bishop and was installed on February 24, 1973. At that time, the Columban Fathers took care of the apostolic services for the first 13 parishes in the newly formed diocese.

As of 2008, the Diocese of Pagadian had 24 parishes.

During World War II 
Pagadian was occupied by Japanese troops during World War II. From November 5 to 20, 1944, the combined American and Filipino troops including recognized guerrillas were attempted to take the town from the Japanese. Sixteen Japanese soldiers were killed, but they remained in possession of Pagadian. The establishment of the general headquarters of the Philippine Commonwealth Army and the Philippine Constabulary were stationed in Pagadian and active from November 21, 1944, to June 30, 1946, during and in the aftermath of World War II, including the military operations and engagements against the Japanese and liberated areas in Mindanao from November 21, 1944, to August 15, 1945.

During the Marcos dictatorship 
The 1970s brought a period of numerous concurrent conflicts on the island of Mindanao, including Dumingag and Zamboanga del Sur.  This included land dispute conflicts arising from the influx of settlers from Luzon and Visayas, and from the Marcos administration’s encouragement of militia groups such as the Ilaga. News of the 1968 Jabidah massacre ignited a furor in the Moro community, and ethnic tensions encouraged with the formation of secessionist movements. Additionally, an economic crisis in late 1969, violent crackdowns on student protests in 1970, and 1971, and eventually the declaration of Martial Law all led to the radicalization of many students.  Many of them left schools in Manila and joined New People's Army units in their home provinces, bringing the Marxist-Leninist Maoist armed conflict to Mindanao for the first time.

One of the prominent victims of the period was Mateo Olivar, a church worker who served in the Roman Catholic Diocese of Pagadian's Community-Based Health Program and Family Life Apostolate.  The nature of Olivar's work, which involved travelling to the hinterlands of the province, led him to be falsely suspected as a "revolutionary organizer." Despite public statements by the Diocese of Pagadian to clarify that Olivar was "organizing for liberation, not revolution," Olivar was assassinated by three unidentified assailants on November 7, 1985, near a Military checkpoint in Dimasangca, Labangan, Zamboanga del Sur. Olivar was deeply mourned by the religious community in Pagadian, and on the day Olivar was buried, the bishop of Pagadian honored Olivar and ordered that Olivar's funeral mass would be the only mass said for the day. Olivar would later be honored by having  his name inscribed on the wall of remembrance at the Philippines’ Bantayog ng mga Bayani, which honors the heroes and martyrs who fought against Ferdinand Marcos and his martial law regime.

Cityhood
In October 1990 President Corazon Aquino issued the Executive Order 429 that designated Pagadian City as the Regional Center for Region - IX (Zamboanga Peninsula). Four years later in November 2004, Pagadian was officially designated as the Regional Center for the Zamboanga Peninsula.

Timeline

Geography 
Pagadian is on the northeastern side of the Western Mindanao region, bordering on Illana Bay. It is bounded by the municipalities of Tigbao and Dumalinao on the southwest, Lakewood on the west, Labangan on the east and northwest, and Midsalip on the north.

About 45% of the total city area is steeply sloping terrain of hills and mountains on the northwestern portion that covers an estimated 15,090 hectares. Mt. Sugarloaf (1,376 m.), Mt. Pinukis (1,213 m.), and Mt. Palpalan (650 m.) are the three notable mountain peaks. Areas in the direct north and central part, have gentle to moderate slopes, making up 47% of the total. The remaining 8% is level or nearly level which makes up most of the eastern and the southern parts of the city. The urban area covers about 845.48 hectares. Elevation of the urban area of the city ranges from 1 MSL (mean sea level) near Pagadian Bay to about 100 MSL in the area of Barangay San Jose.

The Tiguma, Bulatoc, Gatas, and Balangasan Rivers, drain to Pagadian Bay and serve as natural drainage. Due to its topography, most of the city's 54 barangays do not experience flooding. The low-lying southern and eastern part of the city occasionally experience flooding, especially during heavy rains.

Climate 

Located within the tropics of the northern hemisphere, Pagadian has a pronounced dry season from January to March and rainy season from April to December. The area is generally not affected by tropical storms and typhoons as it is located outside the Philippine Typhoon Belt. The prevailing winds are the southwest wind that blow from over the sea during dry seasons going northeast, and the trade winds brought from the mountain ranges. Rainfall distribution is moderate from  annually.

Barangays

Pagadian is politically subdivided into 54 barangays of which 19 of these are classified as urban and which 35 of these are classified as rural.

Urban

 Balangasan (poblacion)
 Balintawak
 Banale
 Buenavista
 Dao
 Dumagoc
 Gatas (poblacion)
 Kawit
 Lumbia
 Napolan
 San Francisco (poblacion)
 San Jose (poblacion)
 San Pedro (poblacion)
 Santa Lucia (poblacion)
 Santa Maria
 Santiago (poblacion)
 Santo Niño (poblacion)
 Tiguma
 Tuburan (poblacion)

Rural

 Alegria
 Baloyboan
 Bogo
 Bomba
 Bulatok
 Bulawan
 Dampalan
 Danlugan
 Datagan
 Deborok
 Ditoray
 Gubac
 Gubang
 Kagawasan
 Kahayagan
 Kalasan
 La Suerte
 Lala
 Lapidian
 Lenienza
 Lison Valley
 Lourdes
 Lower Sibatang
 Lumad
 Macasing
 Manga
 Muricay
 Palpalan
 Pedulonan
 Poloyagan
 Tawagan Sur
 Tulangan
 Tulawas
 Upper Sibatang
 White Beach

Demographics

The people of Pagadian (Pagadianons) are classified into three main groups which is based primarily on faith and heritage: (a) the Subanens (or any other indigenous tribes who had been living in the area before the advent of Islam in Mindanao), (b) the Muslim settlers who came from other parts of Mindanao and other places such as Sabah and Indonesia, and (c) the Christian settlers who generally came from the Visayas and Luzon.

The majority of Pagadianons speak the Cebuano language. The national language, Filipino (Tagalog) is widely understood and is the native tongue of a small percentage of the population. Maguindanaon, Iranun, Maranao, Tausug, and Samal languages are used by the Muslim community. The Subanen dialect is exclusively used by the Subanen people, the original inhabitants of the area. Remaining percentage of the population are classified as Hiligaynon and Zamboangueño speakers. As with the rest of the Philippines, English is widely understood and is used as the primary language for business.

Religion
Places of worship in Pagadian:

Economy 

Agriculture is the primary economic resource, with the production of rice, corn, coconut, fruit, root crops and animal husbandry. Special funding-assistance programs by the government are made available for local farmers; the City Livelihood Development Assistance Program (CILDAP) extends loans to those who need financial assistance for their livelihood.

Production of raw materials like seaweeds, coco processing, cassava constitute a large part of the local economy; small-scale manufacturing of furniture and decors made out of wood, bamboo, rattan, steel and plastic; handicrafts made out of bamboo, rattan, coco shell, wood, marine shell, ceramics, and weaving.

Pagadian Bay and the outer Illana Bay (Iranun Bay) abound with a wide variety of marine products; seaweed culture farming is flourishing in waters off the bay while fishponds near or along the bay yields milkfish, prawns and crabs. A number of large deep-sea fishing vessels that venture into the Sulu Sea and as far as the South China Sea make Pagadian fishport their base of operation.

Another income-generating industry is mining in an area located 1.5 km southeast of Barangay Lison Valley proper approximately forty-nine kilometers from the city proper which yields gold, copper and molybdenum.

Culture

Festivals 
The City Fiesta is celebrated every third Sunday of January in honor of its patron saint, the Holy Child Jesus (Santo Niño) which coincides with the feastday of Cebu City. It is officially called the Pasalamat Festival highlighted with a fluvial parade (regatta), trade exhibits, the Mutya ng Pagadian beauty pageant, carnival shows and a civic military parade. On every June 21, the Araw ng Pagadian is celebrated in commemoration of its founding as a chartered city; as Capital of Zamboanga del Sur, the city hosts the annual provincial celebration in September with agro-trade exhibits, a civic-military parade, cultural presentations and sports competitions.

The Megayon Festival is a week-long celebration that coincides with the Zamboanga del Sur anniversary in September. It honors the tri-people settlers: the Subanens, BangsaMoro Muslims and Christians. "Megayon" is a Subanen word which means "Unity and Solidarity". The festival is a showcase of three distinctly different cultural heritage in songs, dances, rituals of peace, foods and crafts, to foster unity and understanding among the three cultures. Environment-related activities, peace and development forum, and indigenous sports competitions are being held.

Pagadian City also officially celebrates the Chinese New Year. It honors the local Chinese community.

Tourism

The Pagadian Rotonda is a circular park at the apex of the F.S. Pajares Avenue and overlooks the Illana Bay. It is at the intersection of the North Diversion Road and F.S. Pajares Avenue, two of the three major road networks in the city (the third one being Rizal Avenue). Dao Dao Islands. The name is shared by two islands within Illana Bay; thus the addition of Dako (big) and Gamay (small) to the names of the islands for simple distinction. "Dao Dao Dako" is the bigger island which is about a hectare and is about 7 to 10‑minute ride by motorboat from the seaport. It has artificial coral reefs made of old tires. "Dao Dao Gamay" is technically not an island, but a sandbar that partially submerges during high tide. Springland Resort is a natural springwater resort, it has three swimming pools and a fishpond and multifunction halls for gatherings.  Balas is the literal translation for "white sand" in the local dialect. It is classified as a white sandbar. A number of caves and waterfalls can also be found in remote barangays of the city. 
The Provincial Government Complex is the civic, sports and cultural center of the Province of Zamboanga del Sur of which Pagadian is the capital. Sports facilities such as a standard-sized oval track and field, standard sized swimming pools and buildings for indoor/outdoor sports as well as a cultural village and the Unity Park, a monument to the Tri-people group (the Lumads, Moslems and Christians) who settled in Pagadian, are located there.

Government

The city is governed by the City Mayor. The local Sangguniang Panglungsod (City Legislative Council) is presided by the City Vice Mayor with ten elected councilors, and two ex-officio members from the Sangguniang Kabataan (Youth Council) and Association of Barangay Captains (ABC) respectively, as members of the council. The city mayor, vice mayor, and councilors are popularly elected to serve a three-year term.

Pagadian is also the seat of the Provincial Government of Zamboanga del Sur.

Elected officials for the 2019–2022 term are:

Infrastructure

Transportation

Tricycles are the primary public transport in the urban center while jeepneys usually ply the city's rural barangays. Private vehicles comprises the largest percentage of the traffic. Buses, minibuses, and jeepneys are the modes of transportation for transients bound for the neighboring municipalities and other parts of Zamboanga del Sur. These short-travel transports also serve the bus terminal which is located downtown.

Airport. The city is served by a Principal Airport Class 1 (or major domestic). It is located in Barangay Muricay, approximately five kilometers from the city proper. The airport serves as the only air portal in the Province of Zamboanga del Sur with direct flights to and from Manila and Cebu.

Seaport. The port of Pagadian City is served by shipping lines operating for both passenger and cargo vessels. Ports of call include Zamboanga City, Jolo and Siasi in Sulu, Bongao and Sitangkai in Tawi-tawi, and Cotabato City.

Integrated Bus Terminal. Served by two major bus companies and several other smaller Public Utility Vehicles(PUVs), i.e. vans, the terminal sits atop the hill as the station for both Eastbound and Westbound transport, particularly for public transports bound for Zamboanga City, Ozamiz City, Dipolog, Cagayan de Oro, Cotabato City, General Santos, and Davao City.

Utilities 

Telecommunications
Philippine Long Distance Telephone Company (PLDT) and Cruztelco are the two major telecommunications providers. A project under the Department of Transportation and Communications (DOTC), the Pagadian City Telephone Exchange (PACITELEX) serves the far-flung barangays that other telephone companies are not yet able to give service. Major cellular phone Service provider in the country serve the city.

Water and power supply
Pagadian City Water District (PCWD or PAWAD) provides the city with potable water supply. Formed in 1976, PCWD has over 14,000 active service connections and sources its water from deep wells and springs.

Electricity is supplied by the Zamboanga del Sur I Electric Cooperative, Incorporated (ZAMSURECO I) from the National Power Corporation Hydro-Electric Plant in Iligan City, sourced from the Maria Cristina Falls. About 77.70% or 42 out of 54 total barangays in the entire city have 24-hour supply of electricity.

Education
Educational institutions in Pagadian include:
Southeast Asian Institute Pagadian City Campus
 Pagadian City Chamber School
 Pagadian City Science High School
 Pagadian City Pilot School
 Zamboanga del Sur National High School
Holy Child Academy
 Medina College-Pagadian
 Saint Columban College
 Southern Mindanao Colleges
 Western Mindanao State University - External Studies Unit
 Universidad de Zamboanga - Pagadian Campus
 Pagadian Capitol College (formerly PCCS or Pagadian College of Criminology & Sciences)
 Eastern Mindanao College of Technology

Media

AM radio stations
DXPR 603 RMN Pagadian (Radio Mindanao Network)
DXBZ 756 Radyo Bagting (Baganian Broadcasting Corporation)
DXKP 1377 Radyo Ronda (Radio Philippines Network)

FM radio stations
91.1 Voice Radio (Kaissar Broadcasting Network)
91.9 Radyo Natin (Manila Broadcasting Company)
93.5 FMR (Philippine Collective Media Corporation)
94.1 Radio One (MIT Radio-TV Network, Inc.)
96.7 iFM (Radio Mindanao Network)
98.3 Energy FM (Ultrasonic Broadcasting System)
99.1 Muews Radio (Sagay Broadcasting Corporation)
99.9 Radyo Bisdak (Times Broadcasting Network Corporation)
103.1 Radyo Kidlat (Zamboanga del Sur I Electric Cooperative, Inc.; affiliated with Philippine Broadcasting Service)
103.9 LCM FM (Subic Broadcasting Corporation; operated by Loud Cry Ministries)
104.7 Radyo Sakto (Malindang Broadcasting Network Corporation)
105.7 Brigada News FM (Baycomms Broadcasting Corporation/Brigada Mass Media Corporation)
106.3 Bell FM (Baganian Broadcasting Corporation)
107.1 Radyo Agong (DCG Radio-TV Network; operated by RSV Broadcasting Services)

TV stations
GMA Channel 3 Pagadian
GTV Channel 26 Pagadian

Cable and satellite providers
Kismet Cable TV
Unique Cable TV
Cignal TV
SatLite
G Sat

Notable people 
Enrique Ona - former Secretary of Health ( - ); former executive director of the National Kidney and Transplant Institute.
Antonio Cerilles - former Secretary of the Department of Environment and Natural Resources (DENR) during the term of President Joseph Estrada; ; Governor of Zamboanga del Sur from 2010 to 2019.
Victor Yu - current Governor of Zamboanga del Sur from 2019–present.
Divina Grace Yu - current 1st district Representative of Zamboanga del Sur, and former vice mayor of Pagadian.
Francese Therese Pinlac - is a member of MNL48's Team L. She was also a member of TGC Senbatsu before being promoted as an official member of MNL48, the official sister group of the highest-selling JPOP phenomenon, AKB48.
Teodoro "Tata" M. Quicoy - former City Councilor of Pagadian City ( - ,  - ,  - ,  - ) and Lawyer.

Sister cities
Cooma, New South Wales, Australia - established in 1975 through the Philippine-Australian Development Assistance Programme (PADAP) being with the contract with the Snowy Mountains Engineering Corporation, based in the City of Cooma, which undertook development projects within the Province of Zamboanga del Sur.

References

External links 

 Pagadian
 [ Philippine Standard Geographic Code]
 Philippine Census Information
 
 Basic Facts for Pagadian

 
Cities in Zamboanga del Sur
Provincial capitals of the Philippines
Populated places established in 1937
1937 establishments in the Philippines
Component cities in the Philippines
Establishments by Philippine executive order